The March 2017 United Kingdom budget was delivered by Philip Hammond, the Chancellor of the Exchequer, to the House of Commons on Wednesday, 8 March 2017. The last budget to be held in the spring until 2020, it was Hammond's first as Chancellor of the Exchequer since being appointed to the role in July 2016.

2017–18 taxes and spending

Taxes

Spending

References 

March 2017 events in the United Kingdom
2017
2017 in British politics
2017 government budgets